Maxim Lando (born October 5, 2002, in Manhasset, NY) is an American pianist.

Lando grew up in Great Neck on Long Island, New York. His parents, a clarinetist and a pianist, ran the local music school there. He began playing the piano when he was three years old. At the age of ten, Lando began studying piano with Hung-Kuan Chen, first at a preparatory class at the New England Conservatory in Boston and then at the Juilliard School's Pre-College in New York. Since the age of eleven, he has been sponsored by the Lang Lang Foundation, which has taken him on concert tours to Spain, Germany, Russia, and the United Kingdom.

In 2015, he became the first American to win first prize at the International Television Competition "The Nutcracker" for young musicians in Moscow. That same year, he placed second at the Kissingen Piano Olympics competition. In 2020, he was awarded the Gilmore Young Artist Award.

References

2002 births
Living people
American classical pianists
21st-century classical pianists
21st-century American pianists
People from Great Neck, New York